Faith Alexis Ford is an American actress. She is known for her roles as Corky Sherwood on the CBS sitcom Murphy Brown, for which she received five Primetime Emmy Award nominations, and as Hope Shanowski on the ABC sitcom Hope & Faith.

Early life
Ford was born as Faith Alexis Ford in Alexandria, Louisiana, the younger daughter of Patricia Walker, a schoolteacher, and Charles Ford, an insurance agent. Ford lived in nearby Pineville and began acting while attending Pineville High School. She moved to Manhattan at the age of 17 where she began to model and find commercial work.

Career

In 1983, Ford landed her first television role on ABC's One Life to Live; her first major role was on the NBC soap opera Another World, where she played Julia Shearer (a role previously played by Kyra Sedgwick) for several years. Ford was let go by the producers and soon moved to Hollywood, where she got a regular role on the short-lived sitcom The Popcorn Kid, had a five-episode appearance on thirtysomething, played a homeless woman on Family Ties, and, later, had her role on Murphy Brown. After a ten-year run, the series ended, and Ford pursued other TV endeavors. In 1998, she executive-produced her own short-lived sitcom, Maggie Winters. Ford also appeared on The Norm Show with Norm Macdonald, Laurie Metcalf, and Artie Lange from 1999 to 2001.

Ford starred with Kelly Ripa in Hope & Faith as Hope Fairfield-Shanowski, a homemaker who lives a peaceful life until her sister, an actress and Hollywood star, moves in with her and complicates her life in a variety of wild and surreal situations. The sitcom ran for three seasons.

In 2004, she published her own cookbook, Cooking with Faith, and credited her mother and two grandmothers for having taught her how to cook. In Disney's film The Pacifier, Ford played the mother of a family whose husband had died. The film was released in early 2005. In 2007, she appeared in the sitcom Carpoolers. In June 2009, she spoke about her series and the future of digital programming at the Digital Content NewFront. In 2011, Ford appeared in the Disney teen film Prom, playing the role of Kitty Prescott, the mother of main character Nova Prescott, played by Aimee Teegarden.

On February 26, 2018, it was announced that Ford would return to a revival series of Murphy Brown along with costars Candice Bergen, Joe Regalbuto, and Grant Shaud. She appeared on all 13 episodes of the revival.

Personal life
Ford was married to Robert Nottingham from 1989 until 1996 and has been married to writer/director Campion Murphy since 1998. Ford's sister, Devon O'Day, is also in the entertainment industry. Ford and Murphy coproduced an original short film entitled Citation of Merit, which appeared in numerous film festivals across the United States. Ford was diagnosed with Graves' disease.

Filmography

Film

Television

References

External links

Actresses from Louisiana
American film actresses
American soap opera actresses
American television actresses
American voice actresses
Female models from Louisiana
Living people
People from Alexandria, Louisiana
People from Pineville, Louisiana
Pineville High School (Louisiana) alumni
20th-century American actresses
21st-century American actresses
Year of birth missing (living people)